"What's the New Mary Jane" is a song written by John Lennon (credited to Lennon–McCartney) and performed by the English rock band the Beatles. It was recorded in 1968 during sessions for the double album The Beatles (also known as "the White Album"), but did not appear on that album.

Recording
An early acoustic demo of "What's the New Mary Jane" was recorded in late May 1968, at George Harrison's Esher home. It featured Lennon singing an octave higher than the final cut, placing the chorus at the very beginning as well as throughout, and switching the words "cooking" and "groovy" in the second verse:

As opposed to:

Another member of the Beatles can also be heard shouting "What's the new Mary Jane? Oh, my goodness!" near the end of the demo. This variation is notably shorter than the released version, clocking in at around 2:40.

The final version of this song was recorded on 14 August 1968 during the recording sessions for the Beatles tenth album The Beatles (aka "The White Album"), with Lennon and Harrison being the only band members playing on the track. Four takes were recorded with the final being marked as the best. It was later mixed in mono on 26 September with "Glass Onion", "Happiness Is a Warm Gun", and "I Will" and in stereo on 14 October before being added to the shortlist for the new album. However, during the album's final mixing stage, it was dropped due to time constraints, bringing the album down to 30 songs.

During an interview, Lennon commented on "What's the New Mary Jane", saying, "That was me, Yoko, and George sitting on the floor at EMI fooling around. Pretty good, huh?"

Release
After the release of The Beatles, Lennon was still adamant about releasing the song. On 26 November 1969, he and his wife Yoko Ono recorded further overdubs with plans for it to be issued as a single by the Plastic Ono Band alongside another unreleased song at the time, "You Know My Name (Look Up the Number)", which was eventually issued as the B-side of the Beatles' "Let It Be" single in 1970. When the other Beatles heard of his plans to release a Beatle track under his own band's name, however, the single was pulled. The song was remixed for inclusion on the album Sessions in 1985, but the album was never released due to objections by the surviving Beatles. The song, more than six minutes long, was not made available until 1996, on Anthology 3. The much shorter first take of the song, without the sound effects added by Lennon and Ono, was later included on the 50th anniversary reissue of The Beatles in 2018, along with the May 1968 demo.

Song structure
The song has three verses and a chorus ("What a shame, Mary Jane had a pain at the party") and then about 3 minutes consisting of avant garde sound effects. The track ends with a comment from Lennon: "That’s it, before we get taken away". (Part of the word "away" is cut off.)

Magic Alex
In a 1969 interview with NME, Lennon credited head of Apple Electronics and friend Magic Alex with writing half of the song, though this credit was later revoked without explanation.

Personnel
John Lennon – lead vocals, piano, tambourine, effects
George Harrison – vocals, acoustic guitar, percussion, effects
Yoko Ono – vocals, percussion, effects (Swanee whistle, football rattle,  ripping paper percussion )
Mal Evans – handbell, effects
Personnel per The Beatles Bible except where indicated

Notes

Bibliography
 

The Beatles songs
Songs written by Lennon–McCartney
1996 songs
Song recordings produced by George Martin
Experimental music songs